Hoseynabad-e Mahunak (also Romanized as Ḩoseynābād-e Māhūnak; also known as Ḩoseynābād) is a village in Kuh Panj Rural District, in the Central District of Bardsir County, Kerman Province, Iran. Its population in 2006 was 34, in 12 families.

References 

Populated places in Bardsir County